Events in the year 2023 in East Timor.

Incumbents

Events 

2023 East Timorese parliamentary election

References 

 

 
2020s in East Timor
Years of the 21st century in East Timor
East Timor
East Timor